Waimatuku is a small Southland, New Zealand farming community on the Southern Scenic Route, on  between Invercargill and Riverton. The community's name is Māori for "water of the bittern".

It is home to the Waimatuku Pipe Band and the Waimatuku Warriors mixed netball team. Traditionally, the area has been a strong sheep farming district, but dairy farming is increasing in popularity.

External links
Waimatuku Pipe Band

Populated places in Southland, New Zealand